Below is a table of the twenty tallest buildings in Saint Paul, Minnesota. Since 1987 the tallest building has been the 471-foot Wells Fargo Place.

Tallest buildings

Tallest under construction, approved, and proposed

See also
 List of tallest buildings in Minneapolis
 List of tallest buildings in Minnesota

References

Tallest skyscrapers of St. Paul

St. Paul
Buildings and structures in Minnesota
Tallest in Saint Paul
Buildings and structures in Saint Paul, Minnesota